The men's singles nine-ball competition at the 2017 World Games took place from 26 to 29 July 2017 at the Wroclaw Congress Center in Wrocław, Poland.

Bracket

References

Nine-ball - men's singles
Pool competitions